The 1980 Fresno State Bulldogs football team represented California State University, Fresno as a member of the Pacific Coast Athletic Association (PCAA) during the 1980 NCAA Division I-A football season. Led by Jim Sweeney, who returned for his third season as head coach after a two-year hiatus, the Bulldogs compiled an overall record of 5–6 with a mark of 1–4 in conference play, tying for fourth place in the PCAA. 

The 1980 season saw the opening of a new on-campus football stadium, Bulldog Stadium. This increased the seating capacity for Fresno State football from 13,000 to 30,000.

Schedule

Team players in the NFL
The following were selected in the 1981 NFL Draft.

References

Fresno State
Fresno State Bulldogs football seasons
Fresno State Bulldogs football